Salomonia is a genus of true bugs belonging to the family Aphrophoridae.

Species
 Salomonia fusca Lallemand, 1940

References

Aphrophoridae